Suresh Kumar Sharma (born 9 October 1946) is an Indian politician associated with Bharatiya Janata Party who served as the Minister of Urban Development & Housing in Sixth Nitish Kumar ministry. He lost 2020 election from Muzaffarpur (Vidhan Sabha constituency) against Bijendra Chaudhary of Indian National Congress.

Political Background 
First time He was elected to the Bihar Legislative Assembly from Muzaffarpur (Vidhan Sabha constituency) as a member of the Bharatiya Janata Party in 2010.

Again in the 2015 He had won from the same seat  Muzaffarpur (Vidhan Sabha constituency) elected second time for the Bihar Legislative Assembly as a Member of Bharatiya Janata Party.

Suresh Kumar Sharma lost 2020 Bihar Legislative assembly election from Muzaffarpur (Vidhan Sabha constituency).

References 

Bharatiya Janata Party politicians from Bihar
Members of the Bihar Legislative Assembly
Living people
1946 births